One Thousand and One Nights (sometimes referred to as Arabian Nights) is a ballet in two acts by Fikret Amirov to a libretto by playwrights Magsud Ibrahimbeyov and Rustam Ibragimbekov, together with the choreographer Naila Nazirova and artist Togrul Narimanbekov. The libretto is based on episodes from One Thousand and One Nights, a collection of stories and folk tales compiled in Arabic during the Islamic Golden Age. The ballet premiered in 1979 at the Azerbaijan State Opera and Ballet Theater.

Background and performance history

Videos
Ballet Arabian Nights (One Thousand and One Nights) - the first part site YouTube
Ballet Arabian Nights (One Thousand and One Nights) - the second part site YouTube
Ballet Arabian Nights (One Thousand and One Nights) - the third part site YouTube

Ballets by Fikret Amirov
1979 ballet premieres
Ballet in Azerbaijan